Sonora is the county seat of Tuolumne County, California. Founded during the California Gold Rush by Mexican miners from Sonora (after which the city is named), the city population was 11,985 during the 2020 Census, an increase of 393 from the 11,985 counted during the 2010 Census.

Sonora is the only incorporated community in Tuolumne County.

History

Sonora was founded by Mexican miners during the California Gold Rush.  Named after their home state of Sonora, Mexico, it was once a booming center of industry and trade in California's Mother Lode. Most of the gold that was removable with traditional mining techniques was quickly extracted, leaving miners to use more complex and expensive mining techniques to reach deep pockets of quartz and gold. Sonora as well as other mining towns of the era experienced economic hardship when the value of gold decreased.  As "gold fever" died down, Sonora's size and population steadily decreased over the years. In c. 1851, the Sonora Hebrew Cemetery was formed by the Hebrew Benevolent Society and is mostly the graves of European-born Jews who emigrated to Gold Country.

As detailed in the 2005 memoir of novelist David Carkeet, Campus Sexpot, Sonora was fictionalized as "Wattsville", the setting of Dale Koby's cult/underground classic (also titled Campus Sexpot).   The sequel, From Roundheel To Revolutionary by Jeff Daiell, also takes place primarily in "Wattsville"/Sonora.

A local museum preserves the town's Gold Rush legacy.

Geography

Climate
Sonora has cool, wet winters and hot, mostly dry summers.

There are an average of 60 days annually with measurable precipitation. Average annual snowfall is only . The Köppen Climate Classification subtype for this climate is Csa (hot-summer Mediterranean climate).

Demographics

2010

At the 2010 census Sonora had a population of 4,903. The racial makeup of Sonora was 4,402 (89.8%) White, 24 (0.5%) African American, 95 (1.9%) Native American, 79 (1.6%) Asian, 12 (0.2%) Pacific Islander, 84 (1.7%) from other races, and 207 (4.2%) from two or more races. Hispanic or Latino of any race were 542 people (11.1%).

The census reported that 4,613 people (94.1% of the population) lived in households, 85 (1.7%) lived in non-institutionalized group quarters, and 205 (4.2%) were institutionalized.

There were 2,199 households, 562 (25.6%) had children under the age of 18 living in them, 689 (31.3%) were opposite-sex married couples living together, 308 (14.0%) had a female householder with no husband present, 116 (5.3%) had a male householder with no wife present.  There were 192 (8.7%) unmarried opposite-sex partnerships, and 12 (0.5%) same-sex married couples or partnerships. 881 households (40.1%) were one person and 312 (14.2%) had someone living alone who was 65 or older. The average household size was 2.10.  There were 1,113 families (50.6% of households); the average family size was 2.77.

The age distribution was 975 people (19.9%) under the age of 18, 526 people (10.7%) aged 18 to 24, 1,266 people (25.8%) aged 25 to 44, 1,324 people (27.0%) aged 45 to 64, and 812 people (16.6%) who were 65 or older.  The median age was 39.7 years. For every 100 females, there were 93.0 males.  For every 100 females age 18 and over, there were 89.9 males.

There were 2,463 housing units at an average density of 800.2 per square mile, of the occupied units 898 (40.8%) were owner-occupied and 1,301 (59.2%) were rented. The homeowner vacancy rate was 4.6%; the rental vacancy rate was 8.6%.  1,960 people (40.0% of the population) lived in owner-occupied housing units and 2,653 people (54.1%) lived in rental housing units.

2000

At the 2000 census, there were 4,423 people in 2,051 households, including 1,046 families, in the city. The racial makeup of the city was 91.4% White, 0.7% African American, 1.5% Native American, 1.2% Asian, 0.1% Pacific Islander, 2.0% from other races, and 3.1% from two or more races. Hispanic or Latino of any race comprise 8.4% of the population.

There were 2,051 households, 24.0% had children under the age of 18, 33.2% were married couples living together, 14.0% had a female householder with no husband present, and 49.0% were non-families. 40.3% of households were made up of individuals, and 15% had someone living alone who was 65 or older.  The average household size was 2.06 and the average family size was 2.75.

The age distribution was 20.4% under the age of 18, 9.5% from 18 to 24, 26.3% from 25 to 44, 23.5% from 45 to 64, and 20.4% who were 65 or older.  The median age was 41 years.  For every 100 females, there were 82.8 males.  For every 100 females age 18 and over, there were 77.1 males.

The median household income was $28,858 and the median family income was $39,722. Males had a median income of $40,958 versus $26,111 for females. The per capita income for the city was $19,248.  16.9% of the population and 10.9% of families were below the poverty line.  Out of the total population, 22.8% of those under the age of 18 and 7.2% of those 65 and older were living below the poverty line.

Political affiliation 
Sonora is politically diverse but tilts slightly towards the Republican Party, though Sorona's inner regions are supportive of Democrats. In the 2020 presidential election, GOP incumbent Donald Trump won Sorona's outer regions while Joe Biden took Sorona's inner regions; residents of Sonora however supported Biden by much higher margins in general than they did support Hillary Clinton in the 2016 election.

Economy and tourism

The area economy was historically based on the mining and timber industries, but now relies on tourism. One of two active lumber mills in Tuolumne County was shut down in 2009, but reopened in July 2011.

As a city close to Yosemite National Park, Sonora provides services to some of Yosemite's visitors.  The city also benefits from its proximity to Railtown 1897 State Historic Park.

Education
The city's schools include its namesake educational institutions Sonora Union High School and Sonora Elementary School, as well as Dario Cassina High and the Foothill Horizons Outdoor School.

Columbia Community College is part of Yosemite Community College District (YCCD) which also includes Modesto Junior College is the sole college in Tuolumne County and offers two-year degrees. Individuals wishing to attend a university must commute 50 miles to University of California, Merced or California State University, Stanislaus in Turlock.

Government and politics

Sonora uses a city council consisting of five council members, including the mayor. The city council appoints a city administrator to implement the council's policies and enforce ordinances. As of March 2020, the current mayor of Sonora is Matt Hawkins and the current city administrator is Melissa Eads.

Culture and arts

The newspaper of record for the Sonora area is the Union Democrat.

The Tuolumne County Film Commission describes Sonora as "one of the country's most versatile locations", where more than "300 film and television series" have been made.

Local museums depict the Gold Rush era and historic Sonora.

The small town is home to two resident theatre companies. The community theatre Stage 3  produces comedic and dramatic plays in its small space, often providing pre-show musical entertainment from local singers and groups. The professional theatre company Sierra Repertory Theatre produces a variety of musicals and plays each year at two different theatre buildings, the East Sonora Theatre and the Fallon House Theatre in Columbia.

Sonora is also home to the Tuolumne County Arts Alliance.

The pilot, and various scenes, of the television show, Little House on the Prairie was filmed in Sonora.

Notable people 
 Vaughn Armstrong – actor
 Melvin Belli – attorney
 David Carkeet - writer
 Jack Cassinetto – painter
 Phil Coke – MLB pitcher
 Molly Culver - actress
 Charles Dellschau – artist
 T.J. Dillashaw - UFC Bantamweight Champion
 Ross Dwelley - NFL tight end
 Larry Franco - film producer
 James P. Hogan – writer
 Jenny O'Hara – actress
 Josh Parry - NFL fullback
 Dan Pastorini – NFL quarterback
 Francis "Rocco" Prestia - bassist of Tower of Power
 Tata Vega - Entertainer 
 Kahale Warring - NFL Tight End

References

External links

 

 
1851 establishments in California
Cities in Tuolumne County, California
County seats in California
Incorporated cities and towns in California
Mining communities of the California Gold Rush
Populated places established in 1851
Populated places in the Sierra Nevada (United States)